Gregory Soto (born February 11, 1995) is a Dominican professional baseball pitcher for the Philadelphia Phillies of Major League Baseball (MLB). He has previously played in MLB for the Detroit Tigers, with whom he debuted for in 2019. He is a two-time All-Star.

Career

Early career
Soto signed with the Detroit Tigers as an international free agent in December 2012. He made his professional debut in 2013 with the Dominican Summer League Tigers, pitching to a 1-2 record and 4.82 ERA in 16 games (12 starts), and returned there in 2014 where he improved, going 5–3 with a 3.20 ERA in 16 games (ten starts). He spent 2015 with the Gulf Coast Tigers and Connecticut Tigers, posting a combined 2–5 record and 3.23 ERA with 45 strikeouts in 39 total innings between the two teams, and 2016 with Connecticut where he was 3–2 with a 3.03 ERA and 1.43 WHIP in 15 starts.

Soto started 2017 with the West Michigan Whitecaps and was promoted to the Lakeland Flying Tigers during the season. After going 12–2 with a 2.25 ERA and 144 strikeouts between the two teams, he was named the Tigers minor league pitcher of the year.

The Tigers added him to their 40-man roster after the 2017 season.

He spent the 2018 season with Lakeland, going 8–8 with a 4.45 ERA in 113 innings. On January 11, 2019, Soto was suspended for 20 games by Major League Baseball for “conduct detrimental to baseball" under Article XII(B). The suspension started on opening day. He was activated on April 20 and optioned to Lakeland, appearing in one game before being promoted to the Erie SeaWolves.

Detroit Tigers (2019–2022)
Soto made his major league debut on May 11, 2019, against the Minnesota Twins, starting the second game of a doubleheader as the 26th man. He appeared mostly in middle relief for the 2019 Tigers, making seven starts among his 33 appearances and posting a 5.77 ERA with 45 strikeouts.

Soto made the Tigers roster out of 2020 summer camp. On August 29, 2020, he earned his first career save against the Minnesota Twins. With the 2020 Detroit Tigers, he appeared in 27 games, all in relief, compiling a 0–1 record with 4.30 ERA and 29 strikeouts in 23.0 innings pitched.

Soto made the Tigers opening day roster for the 2021 season. Despite allowing a two-run homer, he earned the save in a 3–2 opening day win over the Cleveland Indians on April 1. Soto was named to the 2021 American League All-Star team. At the time of his selection, Soto was 4–1 with a 2.18 ERA. He had 38 strikeouts in 33 innings, and was six-for-six in save opportunities. Soto pitched one inning in the All-Star game, allowing a solo home run to J. T. Realmuto. Soto suffered a fractured finger after getting hit by a line drive on September 17, and was shut down for the remainder of the season.  He finished 2021 with a 6–3 record, 3.39 ERA and 18 saves in 19 opportunities, while striking out 76 batters in  innings.

In the 2022 season, Soto continued his role as the primary closer for the Tigers. On July 10, Soto was selected to represent the Tigers at the 2022 All-Star game, his second consecutive All-Star selection. At the time of the selection, Soto had 17 saves in 19 opportunities, with a 2.67 ERA and 31 strikeouts in  innings. In the All-Star game, Soto came to the mound with two outs in the bottom of the seventh inning. After walking Ian Happ, Soto coaxed a ground ball from 2022 Home Run Derby champ Juan Soto for an inning-ending force out. Soto pitched in 64 games for the 2022 Tigers, compiling 30 saves, a 3.28 ERA and 60 strikeouts in  innings.

Philadelphia Phillies (2023–present)
On January 7, 2023, the Tigers traded Soto and Kody Clemens to the Philadelphia Phillies for outfielder Matt Vierling, infielder Nick Maton, and catcher Donny Sands.

On January 13, 2023, Soto agreed to a one-year, $3.925 million contract with the Phillies, avoiding salary arbitration.

Pitch selection
Soto is mainly a two-pitch pitcher. He throws a sinking two-seam fastball in the 94 to 99 MPH range (topping out at 101 MPH), and a slider in the 86 to 93 MPH range (topping out at 93 MPH). He also throws an occasional four-seam fastball that averages 96–99 MPH.

References

External links

1995 births
Living people
People from Bajos de Haina
Dominican Republic expatriate baseball players in the United States
Major League Baseball players from the Dominican Republic
Major League Baseball pitchers
American League All-Stars
Detroit Tigers players
Dominican Summer League Tigers players
Gulf Coast Tigers players
Connecticut Tigers players
West Michigan Whitecaps players
Lakeland Flying Tigers players
Mesa Solar Sox players
Erie SeaWolves players
Toledo Mud Hens players
Águilas Cibaeñas players